Ctenophorus nguyarna, commonly known as the Lake Disappointment dragon is a species of agamid lizard occurring in low samphire shrubs fringing the remote Kumpupintil Lake (previously Lake Disappointment), Western Australia.

References

Agamid lizards of Australia
nguyarna
Endemic fauna of Australia
Reptiles described in 2007
Taxa named by Paul Doughty
Taxa named by Jane Melville